Hayes Glacier is a tidewater glacier in the Avannaata municipality, located on the northwestern shore of Greenland.

Geography
It drains the Greenland ice sheet southwards into Melville Bay. The glacier front is located to the east of the Tuttulikassak nunatak and south of the Kjer Glacier.

See also
List of glaciers in Greenland

References 

Melville Bay
Glaciers of the Upernavik Archipelago